West Nowra is a suburb of Nowra in the City of Shoalhaven in New South Wales, Australia. It lies west of Nowra.

References

City of Shoalhaven